The Coalition for Democracy and Justice is a Kurdish political party in Iraq, founded by Barham Salih.

In September 2017, Salih announced that he was leaving the PUK and forming a new opposition party, the Coalition for Democracy and Justice which competed in the 2018 Kurdistan Region parliamentary election. Following the death of PUK leader Jalal Talabani and the Kurdish opposition leader Nawshirwan Mustafa, the alliance was seen to have the potential to change the Kurdish political landscape. He said he hoped to gather all the other opposition parties, including Gorran and Komal, to challenge the governing KDP–PUK alliance.

References

2017 establishments in Iraq
Kurdish political parties in Iraq
Political parties established in 2017
Political parties in Kurdistan Region
Social democratic parties in Iraq